TIMEkspressen (Time Ekspressen means "Hourly Express") was an intercity coach brand used by Nettbuss on several routes in Norway. The coaches were usually operated at one hour headway, but some routes had higher frequency in rush hour and lower frequency in the weekends.

Several of the routes operated as TIMEkspressen competed directly with commuter and regional trains run by Nettbuss' owner, the Norwegian State Railways, including on the Kongsvinger Line, the Randsfjord Line, the Trøndelag Commuter Rail, the Vestfold Line and the Østfold Line.

History
The brand was originally started by Øst-Telemark Automobilselskap in 1997 through the company TIMEkspressen Telemark on the route Notodden–Kongsberg–Oslo. In 1998, Nettbuss bought both companies and started developing the brand on other areas served by Nettbuss. On 14 May 2018, the last routes were transferred to the Nettbuss express brand.

Routes
From May 2013, route numbers were preceded by letters "TE". Only major intermediate stops are mentioned.

References

Norwegian brands
Bus transport brands
Vy Buss
Bus routes in Norway
1997 establishments in Norway